Hilda Elisabeth Keyser  (1851–1898), was a Swedish painter.

Biography
Keyser was born on 22 January 1851 in Stockholm. From 1874–78, she attended the Royal Swedish Academy of Fine Arts in Stockholm. She was taught by Swedish painter Vilhelmina Carlson.
From 1878–89, she stayed mostly in Paris, where she studied for Léon Bonnat. From 1890 to 1896, she ran a painting school in Stockholm.

She exhibited at the Paris Salon in 1882, 1883, 1884, 1887, 1888, 1989, and 1890. In 1893 she exhibited her work at the Palace of Fine Arts at the World's Columbian Exposition in Chicago, Illinois.

Keyser died on 16 December 1898 in Stockholm.

Gallery

References

External links
 
 images of Elisabeth Keyser's art on artNET
 

1851 births
1898 deaths
Swedish women painters
19th-century Swedish women artists
19th-century Swedish painters